The Chief Clerk, between 1789 and 1853, was the second-ranking official within the United States Department of State, known as the Department of Foreign Affairs before September 5, 1789. Section 2 of the Act of Congress of July 27, 1789 (1 Stat. 28) establishing a Department of Foreign Affairs, authorized the Secretary to appoint a Chief Clerk, who would have custody of the Department's records whenever the office of the Secretary should be vacant. From 1789 to 1853, when Congress created the position of Assistant Secretary of State, the Chief Clerk was the second-ranking officer of the Department of State, and was responsible for supervision of Department personnel, distribution of correspondence, and day-to-day operations.

All Chief Clerks were designated, not commissioned. After 1853, the Chief Clerk's duties included at various times custody of archives, distribution of correspondence, and supervision of Department personnel and property. The office was abolished on January 26, 1939, re-established August 6, 1942, as the Office of the Chief Clerk and Administrative Assistant, and abolished in the reorganization of January 15, 1944. Although the Chief Clerk was the second-ranking officer until 1853, the holder of the office of Chief Clerk did not always become Acting Secretary of State in the Secretary's absence, and sometimes that position was delegated to other Cabinet members.

List of Chief Clerks 
All Chief Clerks were non-career appointees.

References
 

Chief Clerk
Defunct agencies of the United States government
Chief Clerks of the United States Department of State

ja:アメリカ合衆国国務省首席事務官